Milton Hatoum (born August 19, 1952) is a Brazilian writer, translator and professor. Hatoum is one of Brazil's most eminent contemporary writers. Among other honors, Hatoum was awarded Brazil's most prestigious literary award, the Jabuti Prize, three times for best novel. In 2017, he received the title of Officier de L'Ordre des Arts et des Lettres from the French government. 

Born in Manaus of Lebanese descent, he studied comparative literature in Paris, and has served as professor of literature in universities such as the Federal University of Amazonas (UFAM) and at the University of California, Berkeley.

His first novel, Relato de um Certo Oriente ("Tale of a Certain Orient"), won the Jabuti Prize in 1989. His second novel, Dois Irmãos ("Two Brothers"), won another Jabuti in 2000 and was translated into twelve languages and adapted for television, theater and comics. His third novel Cinzas do Norte ("Ashes of the Amazon") won the Jabuti in 2005, as well as the Portugal Telecom Prize for Literature, Bravo! and APCA awards. In 2008, his novel Órfãos do Eldorado, was adapted for the cinema. 

Over 200,000 copies of his books have been sold in Brazil, and they have been translated in several languages including Italian, English, French, Spanish, Danish, Czech, and Arabic.

Hatoum writes about destructured families in his works, with a political tendency. In two of his books, Dois Irmãos and Cinzas do Norte, Milton Hatoum made a subtle criticism of the Brazilian military regime of 1964–1985.

Early years

Hatoum's father was an immigrant from Lebanon who met a Brazilian of Lebanese origin. During his childhood, Milton lived with the culture, religion and language of Arabs and African Jews. At age 15 he moved to Brasília and finished secondary school in the Brazilian capital.

After that, Hatoum moved to São Paulo. Three years later, he studied Architecture and Urbanism at the University of São Paulo (USP). In 1980 he traveled to Spain on a scholarship from Instituto Iberoamericano de Cooperación. He lived in Madrid and Barcelona. After that, he took postgraduate courses at the University of Paris III.

Career

After concluding his studies, Hatoum returned to Manaus, where he taught French language and literature at the Universidade Federal do Amazonas. Relato de um Certo Oriente was published when he was 37.

He became a Doctor in Literary Theory at USP in 1998. Feeling unsatisfied with the politics in Manaus, he decided to live in São Paulo. Eleven years after publishing his first novel, Milton wrote Dois Irmãos. Between the publishing of the first and second books, he published several short stories in newspapers and magazines in Brazil and abroad.

Recognition
2009 São Paulo Prize for Literature — Shortlisted in the Best Book of the Year category for Órfãos do Eldorado

Novels

Relato de um Certo Oriente ("Tale of a Certain Orient"). São Paulo: Cia. das Letras, 1990.
Dois Irmãos ("The Brothers"). São Paulo: Cia. das Letras, 2000.
Cinzas do Norte ("Ashes of the Amazon"), 2005.
Orfãos do Eldorado ("Orphans of Eldorado"). São Paulo: Cia. das Letras, 2008.
A Noite da Espera ("The Night of Waiting"). São Paulo, Cia das Letras, 2017.

Adaptations
Fábio Moon and Gabriel Bá: Two Brothers, Milwaukie: Dark Horse Comics, 2015; a comic based on Dois Irmãos.
In 2017, Two Brothers (Dois Irmãos) debuted in a miniseries format on TV Globo, directed by Luiz Fernando Carvalho and actor Cauã Reymond in the role of one of the twin brothers living in Manaus.

Short stories

A cidade ilhada
Você tem medo do quê?
Varandas da Eva

References

External links
 Official page 

Brazilian male writers
1952 births
Living people
Brazilian people of Lebanese descent
People from Manaus

International Writing Program alumni